Seki, also Baseke, Sheke or Sekiana, is a language indigenous to Equatorial Guinea and Gabon. It had been spoken in villages of Rio Campo and Northern Bata, along the coast, but its native speakers have begun abandoning the language for Spanish, Fang, and Kombe.
Can be related to Kako spoken in the East region of Cameroon and some parts of the west of Central African Republic.

References 

Kele languages
Languages of Equatorial Guinea
Languages of Gabon